Bear Mountain is located in the northern Lewis Range, Glacier National Park in the U.S. state of Montana. Cosley Lake, followed by Glenns Lake to the southwest of the mountain. Mokowanis Lake is also visible from the peak. The mountain has tremendous views of the east face of Mount Cleveland, the north face of Mount Merritt, and the east face of Chief Mountain.

Climate

Bear Mountain is located in an alpine subarctic climate zone characterized by long, usually very cold winters, and short, cool to mild summers. Winter temperatures can drop below −10 °F with wind chill factors below −30 °F.

Geology

Like the other mountains in Glacier National Park, Bear Mountain is composed of sedimentary rock laid down during the Precambrian to Jurassic periods.

Gallery

See also
 Mountains and mountain ranges of Glacier National Park (U.S.)

References

Mountains of Glacier County, Montana
Mountains of Glacier National Park (U.S.)
Lewis Range
Mountains of Montana